The 2020 Judo Grand Slam Paris was held in Paris, France from 8 to 9 February 2020. The Chinese delegation could not participate because of visa issues due to the COVID-19 pandemic.

Medal summary

Men's events

Women's events

Source Results

Medal table

References

External links
 

2020 IJF World Tour
2020 Judo Grand Slam
Judo
Judo
Grand Slam Paris 2020
Judo